The Shuo Yuan, variously translated as Garden of Stories, Garden of Persuasions, Garden of Talks, etc., is a collection of stories and anecdotes from the pre-Qin period (先秦) to the Western Han Dynasty. The stories were compiled and annotated by the Confucian scholar Liu Xiang. In many cases multiple versions of the same story are included, making the book a valuable source for the study of early texts.

References

See also
Song of the Yue Boatman

External links

 《說苑 - Shuo Yuan》 Chinese Text Project
 Garden of Stories 《說苑》 Chinese text with matching English vocabulary at Chinese Notes

Chinese anthologies
Han dynasty literature